Dr. Alberto "Quasi" del Gallego Romualdez Jr. (14 September 1940 – 14 October 2013) was a Filipino doctor and was the Secretary of Health for the Philippines from 1998 to 2001. He was also the President of Friendly Care Foundation, Inc.

Early life
Romualdez was the eldest of the seven children of Alberto Zialcita Romualdez Sr., a former secretary general of the World Medical Association, and Covadonga del Gallego, a former chairman of the Pathology Department of the University of Santo Tomas Hospital. Among his siblings are footballer Johnny Romualdez and Philippine Ambassador to the United States Jose Manuel Romualdez.

He was a scion of the prominent Romualdez political clan of Manila and Leyte. His uncle Daniel Jr. was House Speaker from 1956 to 1962 while his grandfather Miguel served as Manila mayor during the American colonial period and Leyte assemblyman during the Commonwealth era. A greatuncle, Norberto Sr., served as justice of the Supreme Court.

The late secretary was also a distant nephew of former First Lady Imelda Marcos; his second cousins include Speaker Martin Romualdez, Chamber of Mines of the Philippines President Benjamin Philip Romualdez Jr., President Bongbong Marcos, Senator Imee Marcos and Tacloban Mayor Alfred Romualdez.

Education
Romualdez graduated from the University of the Philippines as Doctor of Medicine, and a Bachelor of Arts in Biological Sciences from the Ateneo de Manila University. He had further education in the United States; Tumor Immunology at the University of Connecticut and Membrane Biophysics at the Harvard Medical School.

Career
His started working at the Department of Health as a Medical Adviser (1979–1982) for the Minister for Health. He was also the director of the Research Institute for Tropical Medicine between 1981 and 1984.

Personal life and death
Romualdez was survived by his wife Peachy and their children. Romualdez died at the age of 73 on October 14, 2013 in Manila Doctors Hospital two days after a heart attack. The exact cause of death was not released by the media, but there were reports of his suffering from lymphoma.

References

1940 births
2013 deaths
Filipino tropical physicians
Secretaries of Health of the Philippines
Estrada administration cabinet members
University of the Philippines alumni
Ateneo de Manila University alumni
University of Connecticut alumni
Harvard Medical School alumni
20th-century Filipino medical doctors
21st-century Filipino medical doctors
Filipino people of Spanish descent
Romualdez family